The ranking structure as well as rank insignia of the Pakistan Air Force (PAF) are primarily based on the ranking structure of the United Kingdom's Royal Air Force. The insignia for PAF officer ranks underwent an extensive change in 2006, whereby British-influenced rank insignia were dropped for the adoption of Turkish-style insignia, while the British ranking style was maintained.



Officer ranks

Enlisted

See also
 Military history of Pakistan
 Pakistan Armed Forces
 Pakistan Army
 Pakistan Navy
 Pakistan Air Force

References

External links
 Pakistan Air Force – Officer Ranks

Pakistan military-related lists